Clube Desportivo de Cerveira  (abbreviated as CD Cerveira) is a Portuguese football club based in Vila Nova de Cerveira in the district of Viana do Castelo.

Background
CD Cerveira currently plays in the Terceira Divisão Série A which is the fourth tier of Portuguese football. The club was founded in 1972 and they play their home matches at the Estádio Municipal Rafael Pedreira in Vila Nova de Cerveira. The stadium is able to accommodate 2,500 spectators.

The club is affiliated to Associação de Futebol de Viana do Castelo and has competed in the AF Viana do Castelo Taça. The club has also entered the national cup competition known as Taça de Portugal on occasions.

Season to season

League and cup history

Honours
AF Viana do Castelo Divisão de Honra: 2001/02, 2010/11
AF Viana do Castelo 1ª Divisão: 1982/83
AF Viana do Castelo Taça: 2009/10

Footnotes

External links
Official website 
Official blog 

Cerveira
Cerveira
1972 establishments in Portugal
Vila Nova de Cerveira